Dorothy Nickerson  (August 5, 1900 – April 25, 1985) was an American color scientist and technologist who made important contributions in the fields of color quality control, technical use of colorimetry, the relationship between color stimuli and color perceptions, standardization of light sources, color tolerance specification, and others.

Background
Dorothy Nickerson was born on August 5, 1900, and raised in Boston.  In 1919, she attended Boston University and in 1923 Johns Hopkins University. She continued her education at summer courses and university extensions at Harvard University, George Washington University, and the Graduate School of the U.S. Department of Agriculture. Her special interest was the science of color, then in significant development.

Career

In 1921, Nickerson joined the Munsell Color Company as a laboratory assistant and secretary to A.E.O. Munsell, who had taken over the firm from his father in 1918. In 1922, the firm moved to New York City and in 1923 to Baltimore. 

In 1927, Nickerson was offered a position at the United States Department of Agriculture (USDA), where she remained until retiring in 1964. When she joined, color science and technology had no international standards as they came into industrial use. Nickerson prodded instrumental in developing the technology and use in agricultural and industrial settings.

Color quality control of agricultural product
In the late 1920s Nickerson worked on usage of disk color mixture to define the color quality of cotton and other agricultural products and the conversion of disk mixture data into the CIE colorimetric system of 1931.

Standardization of light sources for color assessment and color rendering
In the late 1930s, a major occupation was the development of defined light sources for visual assessment of color quality. Later, she was also active in the development and promotion of standard methods for the definition of color rendering of lights.

Color tolerance specification
In 1936 Nickerson published the first color difference formula for industrial use, based on the addition of increments of Munsell hue, chroma, and lightness scale values. In 1943, together with Newhall, she published realistic representations of a three-dimensional perceptually approximately uniform optimal object color solid. In 1944, together with her assistant K. F. Stultz, she published a colorimetric color difference formula,  known as the Adams–Nickerson–Stultz formula, that in modified form eventually became the CIE 1976 L*,a*,b* (CIELAB) color space and difference formula.

Munsell color system and its colorimetric definition
In 1940, a technical committee of the Optical Society of America began a study of the Munsell color system and its definition in the CIE colorimetric system.  Nickerson was an important participant in this effort. The final report of the committee was authored by S.M. Newhall, Nickerson, and Deane B. Judd and its result is known as the "Munsell Renotations," the specification of the aim colors of the current system. Nickerson prepared plots of the Munsell colors in the CIE chromaticity diagram that remain in publication today.

Color charts
In the mid-1940s, Nickerson was active in methods for assessing the color of soils, an effort that found its expression in the Munsell Soil Color Chart, still in use today. In 1957, Munsell issued the Nickerson Color Fan, a color chart for horticultural purposes.  Working with Judd, the chair of the OSA committee that developed the OSA Uniform Color Scales, Nickerson as a member of the committee was also a contributor to that effort for over 25 years and wrote a detailed history of the development of the system.

Personal life and death

She was a member of the US National Committee to the CIE and the International Association on Color where she received the first D.B. Judd Award in 1975. Nickerson was a trustee of the Munsell Color Foundation since 1942, was its president from 1973 to 1975, and assisted in the transfer of the foundation to the Rochester Institute of Technology in 1983 where it helped fund the then new Munsell Color Science Laboratory.

Dorothy Nickerson died age 84 on April 25, 1985.

Awards and recognition
 1931 - Godlove Award: Nickerson became the first individual member of the Inter-Society Color Council, founded in 1931, where she was a lifelong member, received the Godlove Award, and had an award named after herself.
 1970 - IESNA Gold Medal: Nickerson received the Gold Medal of the Illuminating Engineering Society of North America.

In 1959, Nickerson was part of the first class of OSA Fellows one of only five of the 115 members included in this first class.

Works
Nickerson was the author and co-author of some 150 papers and publications, including Color measurement and its application to the grading of agricultural products, USDA Miscell.Publications 580, 1946, 62 p.

Shortly before her death, Nickerson wrote an appreciation of her mentor, Alexander Ector Orr Munsell.

References

External links

 The Inter-Society Color Council records  at Hagley Museum and Library contain the Dorothy Nickerson papers including correspondence; publications and reports; and records from the Munsell Color Foundation, Illuminating Engineering Society, and Optical Society of America.

Color scientists
Boston University alumni
Johns Hopkins University alumni
20th-century American scientists
20th-century American women scientists
1900 births
1985 deaths
Fellows of Optica (society)